Prince Mehdi Qoli Khan-e Qajar-Qovanlou Amirsoleimani[1] (Persian: مهدی قلی خان قاجار قوانلو امیرسلیمانی  November 18, 1850 – May 6, 1937) known as "Majd ed-Dowleh", was a prominent Qajar prince and one of the most influential politicians of his time in Persia. He served as steward and administrator during the reign of Nasser al Din Shah.

Family 
Mehdi Qoli Khan Qajar Qovanlu Amisoleimani was son of Issa Khan-e Etemad od-Dowleh Qovanlu, grandson of Mohammad Qasem Khan-e Zahir od-Dowleh Quovanlou and great grandson of Amir Soleyman Khan-e Etezad od-Dowleh Quovanlu. He was Nasser al-Din Shah's maternal cousin and steward and one of the grandees of the second half of Qajar period who married Touman Aqa Fakhr od-Dowleh, Nasser ed-Din Shah's daughter, in 1883. He died in 1937 and is the ancestor of the Amirsoleymani family. He belonged to the Qovanlu (also spelled Qawanlu) branch of the Qajartribe. The tribe had several other branches, one of the most prominent ones being the Develu, which often fought against the Qovanlu.  Hossein Qoli Khan was one of the youngest sons of the chieftain of the Qovanlu clan, Mohammad Hasan Khan Qajar, and the grandson of Fath Ali Khan, a prominent aristocrat executed by the orders of shah Tahmasp II (possibly at the urging of Nader Qoli Beg, who would become known as Nader Shah after usurping the throne of Iran in 1736, marking the foundation of the Afsharid dynasty). His name now lives on with his grandchildren, which include: Soltan Mahmud Amirsoleimani.

Biography 

Amirsoleimani came from an important aristocratic and well-known family of high-ranking bureaucrats during the Qajar era, from Tehran. He was Nasser al-Din Shah's steward during a period in which Iran maintained a cautious balance between domestic policy with the religious, administrative, and commercial authorities, and in international relations with European powers. Majd ed-Dowleh Amirsoleimani was one of the supporters for an increase in contact with European powers - such as diplomatic, military personnel, technical and educational experts, merchants, archeologists and curious travelers who spend long periods of time in Iran. Due to the threat of intervention by great powers, such as the Russian Empire, with which they nurtured a fragile peace.  He was fluent in English and French and in this regard played a valuable role on the several trips to Europe. Majd ed-Dowleh Amirsoleimani in fact accompanied Nasser al-Din Shah on his first trip and last trip to Europe. Most of the travel has been made by train or by boat.

Name and title 

The full official name and title was Shahzade Mehdi Qoli Khan-e Qajar-Qovanlu Amirsoleimani Majd ed-Dowleh. When surnames became compulsory he took his last title as his family name, viz. Amirsoleimani.
The suffix ed-Dowleh translates literally into "of the government" but in actual usage is meant to refer to the Shah who bestows the title of -Dowleh. Ed-Dowleh can also be translated as "of the Empire or State."

References

Additional sources
Daughter of Persia, Sattareh Farman Farmaian with Dona Munker; Crown Publishers, Inc., New York, 1992.

1850 births
1937 deaths